St Thomas's Hospital Medical School in London was one of the oldest and most prestigious medical schools in the UK. The school was absorbed to form part of King's College London.

History
It was part of one of the oldest hospitals in London, St Thomas' Hospital established in 1173 but whose roots can be traced to the establishment of St Mary Overie Priory in 1106. According to historical records St Thomas's Hospital Medical School was founded in about 1550.  It was admitted as a school of the University of London in 1900 but remained a constituent part of St Thomas' Hospital until 1948 when it formally became part of the university. In 1982 it merged with the medical school at Guy's Hospital to form the United Medical and Dental Schools of Guy's and St Thomas' Hospitals. In turn UMDS was absorbed by King's College London School of Medicine and Dentistry, but the dentists have since been split out into The Dental Institute.

Name
Unlike the hospital which in recent times dropped the possessive "s", the medical school continued with the original spelling.

Departments
Department of Community Medicine

Notable people

Notable former members of staff
 Thomas Wharton (1614-1673) - anatomist best known for his descriptions of the submandibular duct
 William Cheselden (1688-1752) - surgeon and specialist in the removal of bladder stones
 Astley Cooper (1768-1841) - surgeon and anatomist
 Thomas Wakley (1795-1862) - surgeon and social reformer
 Beulah Bewley (1929-2018) - campaigner for women's opportunities in medicine
 Karen Dunnell (b. 1946) - UK National Statistician
 Doug Altman (1948-2018) - statistician
 Edward Headlam Greenhow (1814-1888) - first lecturer appointed at  St  Thomas's
Herbert Barrie, neonatologist

Notable alumni
 Takaki Kanehiro (1849 - 1920) - Japanese naval doctor, first person to discover the link between beriberi and diet.
 Charles Scott Sherrington (1857 - 1952) - Nobel Prize for Physiology for work on functions of neurons
 Havelock Ellis (1859 - 1939) - Physician, sexual psychologist and social reformer.
 Oguntola Sapara (1861 - 1935) - Medical doctor and activist. Known for Smallpox eradication in Nigeria.
 W. Somerset Maugham (1874 - 1965) - Playwright, novelist, short story writer.
 Eric Anson (1892 - 1969) - New Zealand's first specialist anaesthetist.
 Max Theiler (1899 – 1972) - Virologist, awarded the Nobel Prize in Physiology or Medicine in 1951 for developing a vaccine for yellow fever
 Harold Ridley (1906 - 2001) - ophthalmologist who invented intraocular lens 
 John B. Harman (1907 - 1995) - president of the Medical Defence Union and chairman of the British National Formulary
 Rustom Jal Vakil (b. 1911) - Eminent Indian cardiologist, recipient of the prestigious Lasker Prize known as the American Nobel.
 David Anderson, 2nd Viscount Waverley (1911 – 1990), British cardiologist and member of the House of Lords
 Richard Doll (1912 - 2005) - Epidemiologist and physiologist; established link between smoking and cancer.
 Sir Bryan Donkin - physician and criminologist
 John Cosh (1915 – 2005) - rheumatologist 
 Richard Bayliss (1917 - 2006) - Physician to the Queen and head of the Medical Household
 Dame Cecily Saunders DBE OM (1918-2005) - Nurse, physician and social worker who developed the concept of the hospice and was a pioneer of palliative care.
 Humphrey Kay (1923 - 2009) - Haematologist
 Walter W. Holland CBE (1929 - 2018) - Epidemiologist and public health physician
 Anthony Yates - rheumatologist and consultant, president of the British Association for Rheumatology and of the Rheumatology and Rehabilitation Section of the Royal Society of Medicine 
 Mary Baines (1932 - 2020) - palliative care physician
 David Owen (b. 1938) - Labour Foreign Secretary and founder of the Social Democratic Party.
 Elizabeth M. Bryan (1942 - 2008) - Paediatrician and expert on twins.
 Philip Poole-Wilson (1943 - 2009) - cardiologist
 Sir Gordon Duff (b. 1947) - Principal of St Hilda's College, Oxford
 Vicky Clement-Jones (1948 - 1987) - Founder of the British Association for Cancer United Patients.
 Jeffrey Tate (b. 1948) - Conductor
 Gilbert Thompson (physician) (born 1932)  -  lipidology expert and academic
 Roger Jones (b. 1948) - professor of general practice, and editor of the British Journal of General Practice
 James Colthurst (born 1957), radiologist
 Fiona Wood AM (b. 1958) - Plastic surgeon, Australian of the Year 2005.
 Phil Hammond (b. 1962) - comedian and commentator on health issues

References

External links
Lists of St. Thomas's Hospital Medical School students 
List of St. Thomas's Hospital Medical School military personnel, 1914-1918

Medical schools in London
16th-century establishments in England
History of the London Borough of Lambeth
United Hospitals
Former colleges of the University of London
GKT School of Medical Education